The Coastal Fleet (Kfl) was until 1994 a Swedish Navy authority with the main task of training the naval ships commanders and crews. After the formation of the authority Swedish Armed Forces in 1994, the Coastal Fleet remained as a unit until 2000.

History

The Swedish Navy ships were equipped for expeditions during the summer months and were organized in temporary squadrons under the leadership of the Highest Commander (högste befälhavare). In 1904 an Inspector of the Navy's Exercises at Sea (Inspektör för flottans övningar till sjöss) was also appointed, the highest commander of the coastal squadrons. From 1909 the squadrons began to be called coastal fleets. From 1919, the positions of the Highest Commander and Inspector of the Navy's Exercises at Sea (SFS 1918:868) were merged and the position of the Highest Commander of the Coastal Fleet (Högste befälhavaren för kustflottan) was created, which in turn was changed in 1931 to the Chief of the Coastal Fleet (Chefen för kustflottan).

The command flag of the last Chief of the Coastal Fleet, Frank Rosenius, was lowered on 30 June 1998.

Heraldry and traditions

Colours, standards and guidons
The colour of the Coastal Fleet was a double swallow-tailed Swedish flag, which was presented in 1976. It was later taken over by the Joint Forces Command.

Coat of arms
The coat of the arms of the Coastal Fleet 1979–1997. Blazon: "Azure, an anchor erect cabled, argent".

Commanding officers

Inspector of the Navy's Exercises at Sea

1904–1906: Wilhelm Dyrssen
1906–1907: Carl Olsen
1907–1916: Wilhelm Dyrssen
1916–1918: Carl August Ehrensvärd

Highest Commander of the Coastal Fleet

1919–1919: Carl August Ehrensvärd
1919–1923: Carl Alarik Wachtmeister
1923–1925: Fredrik Riben
1926–1927: Otto Lybeck
1927–1931: Harald Åkermark

Chief of the Coastal Fleet

1931–1933: Harald Åkermark
1933–1939: Fabian Tamm
1939–1942: Gösta Ehrensvärd
1942–1945: Yngve Ekstrand
1946–1950: Erik Samuelson
1950–1953: Stig H:son Ericson
1953–1957: Erik af Klint
1957–1961: Bertil Berthelsson
1961–1962: Einar Blidberg (acting)
1962–1966: Einar Blidberg
1966–1970: Dag Arvas
1970–1977: Christer Kierkegaard
1977–1980: Bengt Rasin
1980–1982: Bror Stefenson
1982–1985: Jan Enquist
1985–1990: Claes Tornberg
1990–1994: Sten Swedlund
1994–1998: Frank Rosenius

Flag Captains

1904–1907: Commander Herman Wrangel
1907–1907: Captain Carl August Ehrensvärd
1907–1909: Commander Gustaf af Klint
1909–1915: Commander Henning von Krusenstierna
1914–1915: Lieutenant commander Ulf Carl Knutsson Sparre (acting)
1915–1918: Captain Carl Alarik Wachtmeister
1918–1919: Lieutenant commander Henrik Gisiko 
1920–1923: Captain Gustaf Starck
1923–1925: Captain Charles de Champs
1925–1930: Captain Claës Lindsström
1930–1931: Captain Fabian Tamm
1932–1933: Captain Hans Simonsson
1933–1936: Captain Gösta Ehrensvärd
1937–1939: Captain Yngve Ekstrand
1939–1941: Captain Helge Strömbäck
1941–1943: Captain Erik Anderberg
1943–1945: Captain Erik Samuelson
1946–1948: Captain John Wirström
1948–1950: –
1950–1951: Captain Erik af Klint
1951–1953: Captain Bertil Berthelsson
1953–1956: Captain Einar Blidberg
1957–1959: Captain Åke Lindemalm
1959–1964: Captain Magnus Starck
1964–1966: Captain Nils-Erik Ödman
1966–1971: Captain Alf Berggren
1971–1973: Captain Göte Blom
1973–1973: Commander Sigurd Håkansson
1973–1978: Captain Åke Johnson
1978–1980: Captain Lennart Forsman
1980–1980: Captain Bengt O'Konor
1980–1982: Captain Holger Grenstad
1982–1983: Captain Johan Bring
1983–1985: Captain Claes Tornberg
1985–1986: Captain Gustaf Taube
1986–1988: Captain Bengt Uggla
1988–1989: Captain Frank Rosenius
1989–1992: Captain Emil Svensson
1992–1994: Captain Christer Hägg
1994–1996: Captain Olof Jonsson
1996–1998: Captain Anders Stävberg

References

Notes

Print

Further reading

External links
Coastal Fleet Officer Association 

Naval units and formations of Sweden
Naval fleets
Military units and formations established in 1904
Military units and formations disestablished in 2000
Disbanded units and formations of Sweden